Albany Medical Center is the name of the umbrella organization over the Albany Medical Center Hospital and Albany Medical College in Albany, New York. Though the name Albany Medical Center referring to the two institutions on their shared campus has been used for over a century, the two institutions were independent until the formation of the formal Albany Medical Center in 1982. AMC awards the Albany Medical Center Prize, the second-highest value prize in medicine and biomedical research in the United States, annually. Within AMCH is the Bernard & Millie Duker Children's Hospital that treats infants, children, teens, and young adults aged 0–21 throughout the region.

History
In 1839, Dr. Alden March and Dr. James H. Armsby founded Albany Medical College in the former Lancaster School at the corner of Lancaster and Eagle Streets in the City of Albany. Albany Hospital was incorporated in 1849 and established two years later on the southwest corner of Dove Street and Lydius Street (now Madison Avenue). Physicians who taught in the medical school saw patients in the hospital, and students transitioned from lecture halls in the medical school to “shadowing” assignments on the floors of the hospital. The hospital, alongside the Albany Medical College, established a radio station that took on the call letters WAMC in 1958; citing financial burdens, the college/hospital sold the radio station in 1981 to an independent entity, and is the primary member station of NPR for the Albany area. In April 2018, the nursing staff voted to unionize and voted to be represented by NYSNA.

New York State Department of Health designations
Regional Trauma Center
Stroke Center
Regional Perinatal Center
AIDS Center

Deaths
William Wallace Farley (1874-1952).

Arthur Shawcross (1945-2008)

 Ronald DeFeo Jr. (1951-2021), New York mass murderer who killed 6 members of his own family.

Notable patients
David Sweat was treated at Albany Medical Center from June 28 to July 4, 2015, after being shot by law enforcement following his escape from Clinton Correctional Facility.
Weezer lead singer Rivers Cuomo was hospitalized following an accident involving Weezer's tour bus accident on the New York State Thruway in December 2009.

Albany Medical College
Albany Medical College (AMC) is a medical school located in Albany, New York, United States. It was founded in 1839 by Alden March and James H. Armsby and is one of the oldest medical schools in the nation. The college is part of the Albany Medical Center, which includes the Albany Medical Center Hospital.

References

External links
 Albany Medical Center Hospital

Buildings and structures in Albany, New York
Hospitals in New York (state)
Hospitals established in 1849
1849 establishments in New York (state)

Trauma centers